Aleksandr Lapin may refer to:
 Alexander Lapin (photographer) (1945–2012), Russian photographer
 Aleksandr Alekseyevich Lapin (born 1952), Russian writer, columnist and social activist
 Aleksandr Lapin (general) (born 1964), Russian Army general